Daniel Armstrong is an Australian film director. Armstrong is also known for his work as a writer, producer and editor.

Private life
Armstrong grew up in Melbourne, Australia, attending the private school Scotch College, Melbourne. He continued his studies at Melbourne University from 1990 - 1994 receiving a Bachelor of Commerce/Law and a Bachelor of Arts Honours Degree. After graduating Armstrong went on to travel, spending time in the UK, Eastern Europe, Scandinavia and America. Upon his return to Australia in 1998 he completed a post graduate diploma in Multimedia Studies from Swinburne University. 
Never having had any formal film school training, Armstrong credits his expertise to on-the-job experience.

Combining all aspects of his favourite movie genres Armstrong coined the term "Neo-Pulp" describing it as "lovingly embracing the most extreme, cliche, and supercilious elements of pop culture and pulp literature and putting them in a human context... It’s not a spoof, it’s not horror, it’s not action, it’s not sci-fi, it’s not drama. It’s all of these things. It’s neo-pulp." Most of Armstrong's films fall under this category.

Career
Armstrong first begun making films at the age of 12, his first film being "Star Wars vs Greyskull" on his parents 8mm camera. Since then Armstrong went on to create many more films often both writing and directing them. In 2013 he released his first feature film MurderDrome, and in 2015 came From Parts Unknown: Fight Like a Girl. From Parts Unknown was actually filmed before MurderDrome but was not released until later due to what Armstrong quoted as "post-production issues". Both were released on DVD by Monster Pictures.

Filmography

References

External links
http://www.imdb.com/name/nm2730700/
http://www.pcauthority.com.au/Feature/398180,interview-daniel-armstrong.aspx
https://www.facebook.com/StrongManPix
http://strongmanpictures.com/
https://web.archive.org/web/20151127015236/http://www.filmink.com.au/notices/11731/
http://comicbastards.com/movies-tv/interview-with-daniel-armstrong-of-strongman-pictures/
https://web.archive.org/web/20151127031851/http://www.horror-movies.ca/horror_11138.html

1971 births
Living people
Film directors from Melbourne